The 2016–17 Serie A (known as the Serie A TIM for sponsorship reasons) was the 115th season of top-tier Italian football, the 85th in a round-robin tournament, and the 7th since its organization under a league committee separate from Serie B. Juventus were the defending champions. The season ran from 20 August 2016 to 28 May 2017.

On 21 May, Juventus won a record sixth consecutive title and 33rd title overall with a game in hand following their 3–0 win over Crotone.

Events
On 14 April 2016, it was announced that Serie A was selected by the International Football Association Board to test video assistant refereeing, which were initially private for the 2016–17 season, before allowing them to become a live pilot phase with replay assistance in the 2017–18 season at the latest. On the decision, FIGC President Carlo Tavecchio said, "We were among the first supporters of using technology on the pitch and we believe we have everything required to offer our contribution to this important experiment."

On 29 April 2016, Crotone earned their first ever promotion to Serie A. One week later, Cagliari was also promoted after just one year in Serie B. On 9 June 2016, Pescara won the Serie B play-off to return to Serie A after a 3-year absence.

On 13 April 2017, historical Milan president Silvio Berlusconi sold the ownership of the club to Chinese-born, Luxembourg-based Rossoneri Sport Investment Lux, with Li Yonghong as representing acting chairman. The former Prime Minister left the club after 31 years and 29 trophies.

On 28 May 2017, Francesco Totti, AS Roma legendary footballer, played his last match against Genoa.

Teams

Stadiums and locations

Personnel and kits

Managerial changes

League table

Results

Season statistics

Top goalscorers

Hat-tricks

4 Player scored four goals ; (H) – Home  (A) – Away

Number of teams by regions

Attendances
These were the average attendances of the football clubs:

References

External links

 Official website

Serie A seasons
Italy
1